The 1991-92 season of the Philippine Basketball League (PBL).

Occurrences
After two conferences of the season, three teams simultaneously disbanded their franchise, these are A&W Pioneer, Crispa White Cement and RC Cola. Two new teams; Serg's Candies and JCT-Evertex, were accepted as probationary members starting the Invitational Cup on October 24, 1992.
A PBL-Selection participated in the Jones Cup tournament in Taipei.

Philippine Cup

Sta.Lucia defeated Crispa, 81-62, in a playoff on January 21 for last semifinals berth.

The Realtors and the Triple-V Foodmasters came out on top after the double-round semifinals and will play in the championship. Triple-V won their second straight PBL title, defeating the defending Philippine Cup champions Sta.Lucia Realtors by coming back from a 1-2 series deficit to win the last two games.

Maharlika Cup

Six teams advances into the semifinal round. The final standings after the double-round semifinals: Sta.Lucia (19-7), Triple-V (17-9), Magnolia (16-10), Crispa (14-12), Burger Machine (12-14), and Casino (11-15).

Triple-V and Sta.Lucia once again played in the finals. The Sta.Lucia Realtors this time completed a 3-0 sweep and exact revenge over the Foodmasters for the Maharlika Cup title. The Realtors won their 2nd PBL crown while the Foodmasters lost in a finals series for the first time.

Invitational Cup

Five local teams make it to the semifinal round beginning on November 28. The semifinalists' won-loss records in the eliminations will not be carried over and they will start from scratch in order to accommodate guest entry Atlanta Fil-Am, a bunch of Fil-Am cagers from the States, led by the returning Eddie Joe Chavez, who played for the Philippine team under coach Ron Jacobs in the 1981 Jones Cup and among others, Jeffrey Cariaso from Sonoma State and Frank McKinney from University of Hawaii. Four local players beefed up the Atlanta squad coached by disc jockey Bobby Ante.

Triple-V advances in the finals first by beating Sta.Lucia, 73-71, on the last playing date of the semifinal round on December 12, forcing the Realtors in a playoff with Casino Rubbing Alcohol. The Realtors prevailed over the Alcohol Distillers, 63-51, in their knockout game two days later.

For the third time in a year, Triple-V and Sta.Lucia will battle for the PBL championship. The Foodmasters, which acquired Johnny Abarrientos from the disbanded Crispa at the start of the conference, got back over the Realtors via 3-0 sweep in the Invitational Cup finals.

References

External links
 www.philippinebasketball.ph

1991-92 Philippine Basketball League season
PBL
League
League